This is a list of drama films of the 1950s.

1950
 Awaara
 The Capture
 Diary of a Country Priest
 Flowers of St. Francis
 In a Lonely Place
 Los Olvidados
 Seven Days to Noon
 Stromboli
 Sunset Boulevard
 The Ways of Love

1951
 Ace in the Hole
  The African Queen
 The Browning Version
 Cry, the Beloved Country
 Early Summer
 Olivia
 A Place in the Sun
 Rashomon
 The River
 A Streetcar Named Desire

1952
 5 Fingers
 Affair in Trinidad
 Avalanche
 Bad and the Beautiful
 Casque d'Or
 cindrella!
 Come Back, Little Sheba
 Europe '51
 Flat Top
 Forbidden Games
 Ikiru
 Life of Oharu
 Member of the Wedding
 Mother
 Nagarik
 Othello
 Umberto D.
 Viva Zapata!

1953
 A`isha
 The Earrings of Madame de...
 Gate of Hell
 A Geisha
 A Japanese Tragedy (Nihon No Higeki)
 The Thick-Walled Room
 Titanic
 Tokyo Story
 Two Acres of Land

1954
 Boot Polish
 The Caine Mutiny
 Chikamatsu Monogatari
 The Country Girl
 A Generation
 Journey to Italy
 Late Chrysanthemums
 Magnificent Obsession
 On the Waterfront
 Sansho the Bailiff
 Seven Samurai
 La strada
 The Wild One

1955
 Blackboard Jungle
 East of Eden
 I'll Cry Tomorrow
 Der letzte Akt
 Lola Montès
 The Man with the Golden Arm
 Ordet
 Pather Panchali
 Rebel Without a Cause
 Shree 420

1956
 Anastasia
 And God Created Woman
 Aparajito
 Friendly Persuasion
 Giant
 The Great Man
 Lisbon
 Lust for Life
 A Man Escaped
 Requiem for a Heavyweight
 Somebody Up There Likes Me

1957
 12 Angry Men
 The Cranes Are Flying
 A Face in the Crowd
 A Hatful of Rain
 Man of a Thousand Faces
 Mother India
 Nights of Cabiria
 Pyaasa
 The Seventh Seal
 Sweet Smell of Success
 The Three Faces of Eve
 Throne of Blood
 Wild Strawberries

1958
 Ajantrik
 Al-Tareeq al-Masdood
 Alto Paraná
 Les Amants
 Les Amants de Montparnasse
 Amor prohibido
 Another Time, Another Place
 Ashes and Diamonds
 Auntie Mame
 Bari Theke Paliye
 Cat on a Hot Tin Roof
 The Defiant Ones
 Human Condition, Part 1: No Greater Love
 I Want to Live!
 Jalsaghar
 Look Back in Anger
 Madhumati
 A Night to Remember
 The Old Man and the Sea
 Parash Pathar
 The Rikisha-Man
 Run Silent, Run Deep
 Separate Tables

1959
 -30-
 The 400 Blows
 Anari
 Anatomy of a Murder
 Fires on the Plain
 Floating Weeds
 Imitation of Life
 Hiroshima Mon Amour
 Kaagaz Ke Phool
 Kapò
 Neel Akasher Neechey
 Room at the Top
 Shadows
 The World of Apu

References

Drama
1950s